Momona is a small town in New Zealand's South Island.

Momona may also refer to:

 Momona Airport, Dunedin international airport, at Momona, New Zealand
 Momona (Jewelpet), the main protagonist of the Lady Jewelpet series
 Momona Kasahara, a past member of Angerme, a Japanese idol girl group